Rusinowo may refer to the following places:
Rusinowo, Rypin County in Kuyavian-Pomeranian Voivodeship (north-central Poland)
Rusinowo, Pomeranian Voivodeship (north Poland)
Rusinowo, Gmina Wałcz in West Pomeranian Voivodeship (north-west Poland)
Rusinowo, Sławno County in West Pomeranian Voivodeship (north-west Poland)
Rusinowo, Świdwin County in West Pomeranian Voivodeship (north-west Poland)
Rusinowo, Gmina Tuczno in West Pomeranian Voivodeship (north-west Poland)